Chicken Soup Factory is a community in Gardnesville Township, Greater Monrovia District, Liberia. The name hails from a defunct Maggi chicken bouillon cube factory located in the area.

As of 2014 the population of Chicken Soup Factory was estimated at 25,198. Chicken Soup Factory is part of the Montserrado-12 electoral district.

References

Communities of the Greater Monrovia District